Frederick "Fred" William Lowrie (1 March 1868 – 9 August 1902) was an English rugby union and professional rugby league footballer who played in the 1880s and 1890s. He played representative level rugby union (RU) for England and Yorkshire, and at club level for Wakefield Trinity (were a rugby union club at the time, so no Heritage № is allocated), and Batley, as a forward, e.g. front row, lock, or back row, and club level rugby league (RL) for Batley, as a forward (prior to the specialist positions of), during the era of contested scrums. Prior to Thursday 29 August 1895, Batley, and Wakefield Trinity were both rugby union clubs.

Background
Fred Lowrie was born in Wakefield, West Riding of Yorkshire, England, and he died aged 34 of consumption (tuberculosis (TB)) in Leeds, West Riding of Yorkshire, England.

Playing career

International honours
Fred Lowrie won international rugby union caps for England while at Wakefield Trinity in the 7-0 victory over the New Zealand Natives at Rectory Field, Blackheath, London on Saturday 16 February 1889, in front of a crowd of 12,000, and while at Batley in the 0-1 loss to Wales at Crown Flatt, Dewsbury on Saturday 15 February 1890, in front of a crowd of 5,000.

County honours
Fred Lowrie represented Yorkshire (RU) while at Batley, and Wakefield Trinity.

Change of Code
After the schism, Lowrie continued to play for Batley in the Northern Union (rugby league) code.

References

External links
Search for "Lowrie" at rugbyleagueproject.org
Biography of Richard Thomas Dutton Budworth with an England team photograph including Frederick Lowrie
Biography of Arthur Budd with an England team photograph including Frederick Lowrie
Football ~ Notes By Full Back
Football ~ The Rugby Union Game

1868 births
1902 deaths
20th-century deaths from tuberculosis
Batley Bulldogs players
England international rugby union players
English rugby league players
English rugby union players
Rugby league forwards
Rugby league players from Wakefield
Rugby union forwards
Rugby union players from Wakefield
Tuberculosis deaths in England
Wakefield Trinity players
Yorkshire County RFU players